Edward Randall Wiseman (December 28, 1911 – May 6, 1977) was a Canadian ice hockey forward. He was born in Newcastle, New Brunswick, but grew up in Regina, Saskatchewan.

Wiseman started his National Hockey League career with the Detroit Red Wings in 1932. He also played for the New York Americans and Boston Bruins. He retired after the 1942 season. He won the Stanley Cup with the Boston Bruins in 1941.

Career statistics

Regular season and playoffs

External links

1911 births
1977 deaths
Boston Bruins players
Canadian expatriate ice hockey players in the United States
Canadian ice hockey forwards
Chicago Shamrocks players
Detroit Olympics (IHL) players
Detroit Red Wings players
Ice hockey people from New Brunswick
Ice hockey people from Saskatchewan
Montreal Royals (QSHL) players
New York Americans players
People from Miramichi, New Brunswick
Regina Pats players
Sportspeople from Regina, Saskatchewan
Stanley Cup champions